John Balfour (6 November 1750 – 15 October 1842) was a Scottish politician and a civil servant in the East India Company with connections to the Orcadian island of Shapinsay.

Background
John Balfour was the son of William Balfour, a factor to the Dundas family. The family was descended from the Balfours of Trenabie on the island of Westray. Having made a fortune in  India, John Balfour married the widow of a Colonel Mackennan, who along with other British expatriates, had lent money to the Rajah of Tanjore, who then refused to repay the loans.

Political career

Balfour was elected Member of Parliament for Orkney and Shetland on 28 July 1790. He used his new political connections to put pressure on the British Government who eventually engineered compensation for the lenders to the Rajah, so providing his wife with a "substantial benefit". He decided to retire at the next election in 1796 in favour of Robert Honyman. Balfour was MP for Orkney and Shetland again from 1820 to 1826.

Shapinsay
In 1827 he bought the Honyman estate on the island of Shapinsay and the village of Balfour takes its name from the family interest in the island. He commenced the building of Balfour Castle on the island on the site of an older structure. The work was completed by his son, Colonel David Balfour.

Notes

References

External links 
 
Shetlopedia John Balfour
Honyman family

1750 births
1842 deaths
Shapinsay
Members of the Parliament of Great Britain for Scottish constituencies
British MPs 1790–1796
Members of the Parliament of the United Kingdom for Orkney and Shetland
UK MPs 1820–1826
John, Orkney